Chinese cash coins were first produced during the Warring States period, and they became standardised as the Ban Liang (半兩) coinage during the Qin dynasty which followed. Over the years, cash coins have had many different inscriptions, and the Wu Zhu (五銖) inscription, which first appeared under the Han dynasty, became the most commonly used inscription and was often used by succeeding dynasties for 700 years until the introduction of the Kaiyuan Tongbao (開元通寳) during the Tang dynasty. This was also the first time regular script was used as all earlier cash coins exclusively used seal script. During the Song dynasty a large number of different inscriptions was used, and several different styles of Chinese calligraphy were used, even on coins with the same inscriptions produced during the same period. These cash coins are known as matched coins (對錢). This was originally pioneered by the Southern Tang.

During the Yuan dynasty, largely deprecated copper coinage was abandoned in favour of paper money. This trend continued under the Ming dynasty. Cash coins only contained the era names of the emperor during the Ming dynasty. Due to a naming taboo the term "Yuanbao" (元寶) was phased out from cash coin inscriptions as the founder of the Ming dynasty, Zhu Yuanzhang had the word "Yuan" (元) in his name.

The trend of exclusively using the era names on currencies continued during the Qing dynasty, and all cash coins issued during this period were written in regular script.

Below is a list of obverse inscriptions that were used on Chinese cash coins organized by period and/or dynasty.

Warring States 

During the Warring states period, the first precursors of the Chinese cash coins started to appear. These early round coins (圜錢, huánqián) circulated alongside the knife and spade money. As most of these early round coins had round holes, the first "true" cash coins were the Yi Hua (一化) produced by the State of Yan. Apart from two small and presumably late coins from the State of Qin, coins from the spade money area have a round hole and refer to the jin and liang units. Those from the knife money area have a square hole and are denominated in hua.

Round hole, no rims, reverses plain and flat 

List of early round coins produced between 350 BC and 220 BC:

State of Yan 

List of early round coins produced by the State of Yan between 300 BC and 220 BC:

State of Qi 

List of early round coins produced by the State of Qi between 300 BC and 220 BC:

State of Qin 

List of early round coins produced by the State of Qin between 250 BC and 220 BC:

Qin dynasty 

During the Qin dynasty production of the Ban Liang cash coins continued and its weight was standardised.

Western Han dynasty 

Under the Western Han dynasty the Ban Liang cash coins of the earlier Qin dynasty were retained until a series of monetary reforms replaced them first with the San Zhu and then the Wu Zhu, the latter would be continued to be manufactured for around 700 years.

Xin dynasty 
 

After Wang Mang usurped the throne he instituted various monetary reforms, in AD 9 he retained the Wu Zhu cash coins but introduced two new types of Knife money, between AD 9 and 10 he introduced an impossibly complex system involving tortoise shell, cowries, gold, silver, six round copper coins, and a reintroduction of the spade money in ten denominations. In AD 14, all these tokens were abolished, and replaced by another type of spade coin and new round coins.

List of cash coins issued by the Xin dynasty:

Chengjia 

The rebel Gongsun Shu cast iron cash coins based on the Wu Zhu's of the Western Han dynasty in his rebel state of Chengjia in present-day Sichuan:

Eastern Han dynasty 

The Eastern Han dynasty only cast Wu Zhu (五銖) cash coins.

Kingdom of Khotan 

List of cash coins produced by the Kingdom of Khotan:

Three Kingdoms 

List of Chinese cash coins issued during Three Kingdoms period:

Kingdom of Kucha 

List of cash coins produced by the Kingdom of Kucha:

Jin dynasty and Sixteen Kingdoms 

List of Chinese cash coins produced during the Jin dynasty and Sixteen Kingdoms period:

Northern and Southern dynasties  

List of cash coins produced by the Northern and Southern dynasties:

Sui dynasty 

The Sui dynasty only cast Wu Zhu (五銖) cash coins.

Tang dynasty 

List of cash coins issued by the Tang dynasty:

Local issues 

List of local issue cash coins of the Tang dynasty:

Yan dynasty 

List of cash coins issued by the Great Yan dynasty during the An Lushan Rebellion:

Uyghur Khaganate 

The Uyghur Khaganate manufactured a cash coin with an Old Uyghur inscription under the reign of Boquq Khagan. A later cash coin is known to have been cast by the Uyghurs but it is not known when it was manufactured.

Five Dynasties and Ten Kingdoms

Later Liang dynasty 

List of cash coins produced by the Later Liang dynasty (907–923):

Later Tang dynasty 

List of cash coins produced by the Later Tang dynasty (923–936):

Later Jin dynasty (936–947) 

List of cash coins produced by the Later Jin dynasty (936–947):

Later Han dynasty 

List of cash coins produced by the Later Han dynasty (948–951):

Later Zhou dynasty 

List of cash coins produced by the Later Zhou dynasty (951–960):

Former Shu 

List of cash coins attributed to the Former Shu Kingdom (907–925):

Kingdom of Min 

List of cash coins attributed to the Kingdom of Min (909–945):

Kingdom of Chu 

List of cash coins attributed to the Kingdom of Chu (907–951):

Later Shu 

Cash coins produced by the Later Shu (926–965) include:

Southern Tang Kingdom 

Cash coins manufactured by the Southern Tang Kingdom (937–975) include:

Southern Han Kingdom 

The cash coins produced by the Southern Han dynasty were:

Crude lead coins 

Crude lead cash coins attributed to the Southern Han/Chu area (900–971):

There is a very great variety of such coins; some have crescents on the reverse. The Kai character sometimes looks like yong. Characters and legends often reversed because the incompetent workmen had not mastered the art of engraving in negative to make the moulds. Some specimens have meaningless characters.

Cash coins with hybrid inscriptions from this same area:

These cash coins are typical of the hybrid inscriptions formed by combinations of inappropriate characters. They also have series numbers on the reverse. Note that the radical "" is missing from this Wu Zhu (五朱) coin. One variant of the Wu Wu (五五) coin has the Xin dynasty inscription Huo Quan (貨泉) on its reverse.

You Zhou Autonomous Region 

The following cash coins were produced in the You Zhou Autonomous region (which enjoyed virtual independence from the rest of the empire) between 900 and 914:

Liao dynasty 

Liao dynasty coins (like some contemporary Song dynasty coins) can be read top-right-bottom-left (clockwise), but unlike the Song's coinage never appeared top-bottom-right-left. Liao dynasty era cash coins have appeared in both Chinese and Khitan scripts, but the latter can more accurately be described as a type of Chinese numismatic charms as they weren't meant for circulation.

List of cash coins produced by the Khitan-led Liao dynasty:

Northern Song dynasty 

The cash coins of the Song dynasty are notable in the aspect that many cash coins of the same era that use the same inscription and have the same nominal value come in multiple Chinese calligraphic fonts. Many Emperors of the Song dynasty personally wrote the calligraphy to be inscribed on the cash coin. There are generally three scripts used on Song dynasty era cash coins which include Regular script, Seal script, and Running hand script/Grass script. The reading order of Song dynasty era cash coins exist in top-bottom-right-left and top-right-bottom-left orders.

List of cash coins produced by the Northern Song dynasty:

Sui ethnic minority during the Northern Song dynasty 

In 2004 a coin produced by the Sui people of Guizhou was discovered dating to the Northern Song dynasty most likely produced between 1008 and 1016, this coin had the inscription dà zhōng xiáng fú (大中祥符) on one side and the word "wealth" written in Sui script on the other side, as this is the only known coin produced by the Sui people it established that they don't have a numismatic tradition like the Han Chinese have.

Great Shu Kingdom 

In the year 993 a group of tea farmers and landless tenant farmers under the leadership if Wang Xiaobo rebelled against the Northern Song dynasty, in the year 994 after Wang Xiaobo died his brother-in-law Li Shun proclaimed himself to be the "King of the Great Shu Kingdom" (大蜀王, dà shǔ wáng) in Chengdu after he captured the city ("Shu" being an archaic name for Sichuan). Li Shun was defeated and killed in the year 995. During his period he used the reign era and produced cash coins with this "Yingyun" (應運, yìng yùn) inscription while after his death his former subordinates used the Yinggan (應感) inscription.

List of cash coins issued by the Great Shu Kingdom:

Southern Song dynasty 

Under the Southern Song dynasty it became customary to add the date of issue on the reverse of the coin and as copper shortages and phenomena known as "currency famines" (錢荒) plagued the land both iron cash coins and paper money (in the form of Jiaozi, Guanzi, and Huizi notes) became more common leading to a decline of the production of bronze coinage.

List of cash coins produced by the Southern Song dynasty:

The Southern Song dynasty General Liu Guangshi (劉光世) also cast special cash coins with the inscription "Zhaona Xinbao" (招納信寶) to recruit Jin soldiers and allow them to defect to the Song Army, however these weren't meant for circulation.

Northern Liao dynasty 

A number of cash coins were reported to have the reign titles of Northern Liao dynasty emperors, however as no historical records mention them the authenticity of these coins has been called into question.

List of cash coins presumably issued by the Khitan Northern Liao dynasty:

Western Liao dynasty (Qara Khitai) 

In November 2008, October 2010, and February 2011 three specimens of cash coins produced by the Western Liao were unearthed in Kyrgyzstan, the first specimen of these cash coins were initially thought to bear the inscription "Jixing Yuanbao" (績興元寳) but after the second one was unearthed its inscription was better understood.

Western Xia dynasty 

The Tangut Western Xia dynasty produced both cash coins with Chinese and Tangut inscriptions. Despite issuing coins the economy of the Tangut Empire mostly relied on barter which is why Western Xia era coins today are rare.

With Tangut inscriptions 

Coins with Tangut inscriptions:

With Chinese inscriptions

Jin dynasty (1115–1234) 

Cash coins produced by the Jurchen-led Jin dynasty compared to earlier Liao dynasty coinage are both of higher quality, and quantity; this is because the Jurchens chose to model their coins more closely after the Song's both in production as superficially in its calligraphic style.

List of cash coins produced by the Jurchen-led Jin dynasty:

Li Pobei 

During a Jin invasion that occurred in November 1125, Li Pobei (李婆備) took advantage of this situation and rebelled against the Northern Song dynasty. He is known to have cast cash coins with the inscription "Taiping Tongbao" (太平通寶).

Great Qi dynasty 

In 1130 during the Jin–Song Wars the Jin dynasty had set up a second puppet state called “Da Qi” (after the failed first puppet state, Da Chu), this puppet state briefly produced its own coins until it was defeated by the Song in 1137.

Coins produced by the brief Jurchen vassal state include:

Eastern Xia dynasty 

During a coin hoard in the Russian Far East in 2011 seven cash coins were discovered that bore an inscription which was previously unknown, these coins bore a title alluding to a rebel state that was founded during the Mongol conquest of the Jin dynasty.

List of cash coins issued by the Jurchen-led Eastern Xia dynasty:

Mongol Empire (prior to the establishment of the Yuan dynasty) 

Cash coins issued by the Mongols before 1230:

Cash coins issued by the Mongol Empire while it occupied Jin dynasty territory (circa 1230–1280):

Yuan dynasty 

During the Yuan dynasty, paper money such as the Jiaochao completely replaced copper coinage, during times of inflation Temple coins issued by Buddhist temples became the de facto currency. Under Külüg Khan a large number of cash coins were issued to pay for the state's expenditures but these got phased out in favour of paper currency, it wasn't until the reign of Toghon Temür that the Yuan dynasty attempted to produce cash coins at a large scale again.

List of cash coins issued by the Yuan dynasty:

Rebels of the Yuan dynasty 

During the Red Turban rebellion organised by the White Lotus society; many of its leaders proclaimed their own kingdoms and empires that ruled over different regions of China, the most successful of these was Zhu Yuanzhang's Ming dynasty which would unify China. Though the majority of these countries were short-lived some did produce their own coinage.

Ming dynasty 

Under the Ming dynasty the policy of predominantly using paper money (such as the Da Ming Baochao banknotes) which was started under the Mongols would continue until 1505 when Spanish dollars and other silver coins became the dominant currency. Native production of cash coins had ceased between 1375 and 1376, from 1387 until 1379, from 1393 (as paper money superseded cast coinage completely) until 1433, and finally from 1435 until 1503.

Yongle Tongbao cash coins were mostly cast for foreign trade.

From the Ming dynasty onwards only period titles were used for coin inscriptions and these period titles would (usually) remain constant throughout the reign of an Emperor.

Note that under the reign of the Zhengde Emperor no copper-alloy cash coins were minted however a very large number of Zhengde Tongbao (正德通寶) coin amulets exist, the production of these coin-like amulets started from the late Ming dynasty period and these amulets are still being produced today.

Guizhou local issues 

During the Hongzhi period from 1488 until 1505 some Tribal Commissioners in the province of Guizhou issued their own cash coins, rather than being bases on reign titles the inscriptions were based on place names.

Yunnan local issues 

Under the Ming dynasty the territory which used to belong to the Dali Kingdom cast their own coins, these cash coins were issued in the province of Yunnan under the reign of the Hongzhi Emperor and are known to be of poor workmanship and crude casting, it is often unknown if these cash coins were cast by the Bai people in Dali, the Hmong tribes living in the area, or one of the many other tribes that live in Yunnan as records of their casting weren't bring kept. Many of these cash coins were also cast by using regular cash coins as "mother coins" which explains their rather crude appearances.

These Yunnan local issue cash coins include:

Ming-Qing transitional period 

This is a list of cash coins produced during the transition from Ming to Qing.

Southern Ming dynasty 

List of cash coins produced by the Southern Ming dynasty:

Kingdom of Tungning (Taiwan) 

Under Koxinga the Kingdom of Tungning (which was a state loyal to the Southern Ming dynasty) had ordered Yongli Tongbao cash coins to be produced (presumably) in Nagasaki, these coins circulated exclusively in Taiwan. The production of these coins lasted until 1682.

Rebels

Later Jin dynasty (1616–1636) 
 
The following coins were issued by the Later Jin dynasty:

A cash coin with the inscription "Tiancong Tongbao" (天聰通寳) reported to be in the denominations of 1 wén and 10 wén has also been attributed to Hong Taiji, however the authenticity of this coin is doubtful.

Qing dynasty 

Qing dynasty era cash coins generally bear the reign title of the Emperor in Chinese characters, with only a single change of reign title occurring with the Qixiang Emperor becoming the Tongzhi Emperor by decision of his mother, Empress Dowager Cixi.

Xinjiang issues 

Certain parts of Xinjiang under Qing rule had a monetary system separate from that was separate from that of China proper, this was largely due to the fact that the area which formerly belonged to Dzungaria paid with pūl coins which were made from almost pure copper, when some these pūl coins were melted down to make "red cash coins" the pūl-system was essentially continued and 1 "red cash coin" had a value of 10 regular cash coins. Another differentiating feature of Xinjiang as a whole was that under the Jiaqing Emperor it was ordered that 1 in 5 coins produced in Xinjiang should bear the inscription Qianlong Tongbao (乾隆通寶) to honour the Qianlong Emperor, and celebrate his conquest of the region. New obverse inscriptions were introduced by the Kucha mint during the early twentieth century however the production of "red cash coins" with these new inscriptions didn't last very long as they featured only two different dates from the Chinese cyclical calendar during the Guangxu era and the Kucha mint closed in 1909.

The following "red cash coins" with new inscriptions were produced by the Kucha mint in Xinjiang:

Rashidin Khan Khoja 

During the Dungan revolt from 1862 to 1877, Sultan Rashidin Khan Khoja proclaimed a Jihad against the Qing dynasty in 1862, he issued Chinese-style cash coins minted at the Aksu and Kucha mints with exclusive Arabic inscriptions.

Taiping Heavenly Kingdom 

In 1850 the Taiping Rebellion was started by the head of the God worshippers Hong Xiuquan who founded the Taiping Heavenly Kingdom, this rebellion lasted until 1864. Although very little documentation exists about the coinage manufactured by the Taiping rebels, it is known that in June 1853 the occupying Taiping rebels ordered copper workers in Tianjing (present day Nanjing) with the skills to cast coins to open new furnaces for the production of cash coins with the inscription Tianguo Shengbao that were reported to be "the size of foreign coins" (Mexican pesos), these coins were reported to be of very poor workmanship and their production was quickly discontinued and although no coins fitting this description are extend it is known that Taiping rebels in other areas and provinces did cast coinage.

The following cash coins are known to have been cast by the Taiping Heavenly Kingdom:

Heaven and Earth Society, Shanghai Small Swords Society, and other secret societies during the Taiping rebellion 

At the time of the Taiping rebellion a large number of secret societies such as the Heaven and Earth Society took advantage of the chaos and started to flourish, these secret societies all claimed to want to overthrow the Qing dynasty and restore the Ming dynasty, for this reason many of the coins cast by these secret societies contain hidden messages such as some of them containing characters from the reign titles of Ming dynasty emperors.

Shanghai Small Swords Society 

The Shanghai Small Swords Society under the leadership of Liu Lichuan seized control of the city of Shanghai in September 1853 and awarded themselves the period title of "Tianyun" (天運), as Shanghai had a lot of gold and silver but not much cash coins the rebels confiscated all scrap copper they could find and this was all cast into cash coins with the inscription "Taiping Tongbao" (太平通寶) on the obverse and a sun and a crescent on the reverse, the sun (日) and moon (月) symbolised their intent on restoring the Ming (明). As merchants who traded with Shanghai entered the Qing those found carrying cash coins issued by rebels were arrested and put on trial and after a few were executed the Shanghai Small Swords society decided that these coins were essentially useless and decided to cast coins based on the Xianfeng reign title.

Other secret societies

Other contemporary rebellions 

Other than secret societies several other rebellions cast their own coinages contemporary to the Taiping rebellion, in Guizhou the rebel Zhang Baoshan who claimed descent from the Hongwu Emperor is said by David Hartill to have cast the Sitong Tongbao (嗣統通寶) cash coins according to two references. Li Wenmao who was the leader of the Triad Society in the province of Guangdong proclaimed half to be "the King who shall restore peace" (平靖王) in March 1857 but his rebellion got suppressed by the Qing in 1858. The coinage cast by Li Wenmao often contains the character "勝" (victory or to vanquish) which is often found in lodges of Tiandihui groups creating the inscription "勝寶" (victorious treasure or vanquishing treasure), meanwhile as the guerilla tactics of the Guangdong Triad relied on having their forces be divided into a "left flank", "right flank", "middle flank", "front flank", and "rear flank" this is reflected in the reverse inscriptions of the coins cast by this rebellion as "营" (garrison or camp) is accompanied by which flank the garrison belonged to.

Republic of China 

Chinese cash coins continued to be produced into the first year of the Republic of China until their production was completely phased out in 1912. A large number of trial coins were also cast, however these weren't ever officially issued.

The following cash coins were cast during the Republic of China in 1912:

See also 

 List of Japanese cash coins by inscription 
 Japanese mon (currency)
 Korean mun
 Ryukyuan mon
 Vietnamese cash
 Economic history of China (pre-1911)

Notes

References

Sources 
 

Cash coins by inscription
Coins of China
Coins
Chinese numismatics
Lists of coins